Marigaon Assembly constituency is one of the 126 assembly constituencies of Assam Legislative Assembly. Marigaon forms part of the Nowgong Lok Sabha constituency.

Members of Legislative Assembly 

2016	Rama Kanta Dewri	BJP	
2011	Jonjonali Baruah	INC	
2006	Jonjonali Baruah	INC	
2001	Jonjonali Baruah	INC	
1996	Munin Mahanta	CPI	
1991	Munin Mahanta	CPI
1985	Harendra Bora	IND	
1983	Md Hussain	IND	
1978	Kaliram Dekaraja	INC
1972	Pitsing Konwar	IND

Election results

2021 result

2016 result

References

External links 
 

Assembly constituencies of Assam